Bolotsky is a rural locality (a settlement) in Ivanovskoye Rural Settlement, Kovrovsky District, Vladimir Oblast, Russia. The population was 302 as of 2010.

Geography 
Bolotsky is located 51 km south of Kovrov (the district's administrative centre) by road. Yazykovo is the nearest rural locality.

References 

Rural localities in Kovrovsky District